Leroy or Le Roy may refer to:

People
 Leroy (name), a given name and surname 
 Leroy (musician), American musician
 Leroy (sailor), French sailor
 Jane Remover, musician that has released music under Leroy

Places

United States
 Leroy, Alabama
 Le Roy, Illinois
 Le Roy, Iowa
 Le Roy, Kansas
 Le Roy, Michigan
 Le Roy, Minnesota
 Le Roy (town), New York
 Le Roy (village), New York
 Leroy, Indiana
 Leroy, Texas
 LeRoy, Wisconsin, a town
 LeRoy (community), Wisconsin, an unincorporated community
 Leroy Township, Calhoun County, Michigan
 Leroy Township, Ingham County, Michigan
 LeRoy Township, Lake County, Ohio
 Leroy Township, Pennsylvania
 LeRoy, West Virginia

Elsewhere
 Leroy, Saskatchewan, Canada
 Rural Municipality of Leroy No. 339, Saskatchewan, Canada
 93102 Leroy, an asteroid

Arts and entertainment
 Leroy (film), a 2007 German comedy film
 Leroy (Lilo & Stitch), a character in Leroy & Stitch
 Leroy (South Park), a South Park character
 "Leroy", a 1958 song by Jack Scott

Other uses
 LeRoy (automobile), an early Canadian car manufactured between 1899 and 1904 in Ontario
 "Leroy", a technical lettering system by the Keuffel and Esser Co.